The Lockheed Martin C-130J Super Hercules is a four-engine turboprop military transport aircraft. The C-130J is a comprehensive update of the Lockheed C-130 Hercules, with new engines, flight deck, and other systems. 

The C-130J is the newest version of the C-130 Hercules, and the only model currently in production. , 500 C-130J aircraft have been delivered to 26 operators in 22 countries.

Development

On 16 December 1994, Lockheed received the launch order for the J-model from the United Kingdom's Royal Air Force (RAF). The C-130J launch order occurred after a UK government stalemate of several months that concerned whether to buy new transport aircraft from Europe or the United States. It was paired with a commitment to buy 40 to 50 of the proposed European Future Large Aircraft aircraft (FLA, which was later designated as the A400M). The FLA commitment, which reduced the size of the C-130J launch order, was intended to ensure a 20 percent British workshare in the FLA program, and to prevent German industry from threatening British Aerospace's position as the wing manufacturer on the FLA and future Airbus commercial projects. The RAF ordered 25 aircraft for a total fixed price of US$1.6 billion, with first deliveries originally scheduled to begin in November 1996. The promised deliveries of the C-130J allowed the British Ministry of Defence to meet the 1996 deadline for replacing half of the RAF's aging fleet of Hercules aircraft, while the FLA aircraft was not expected to be available at the time until 2003.

To speed up the sale of military and commercial versions of the aircraft, Federal Aviation Administration (FAA) civil certification was pursued before delivery would happen. Civil certification was not a regulatory requirement and was unneeded for the RAF launch order. However, certification was stipulated in Lockheed Martin's contracts with some subsequent customers, including the United States Air Force (USAF) and the Royal Australian Air Force (RAAF).

The program suffered from problems such as software integration glitches that extended the schedule by three months, followed by a nine-month delay caused by undiscovered stall characteristics that required aircraft modification. The stall problem was caused by the additional power of the engines and the increase in propeller blades from 4 to 6, which changed the aerodynamics so that the aircraft had a greater tendency to stall and roll at lower speeds. 

Lockheed Martin spent five months making 20 unsuccessful attempts at aerodynamic solutions, but the stall problems were so varied that the fixes it tried to make applied only to specific conditions (such as only during power off, or only at full power). Lockheed Martin changed the cockpit to include a stick pusher, which takes control and automatically pushes down the aircraft's nose if the pilot doesn't respond to stall warnings. The stick pusher was meant to be a temporary addition until Lockheed Martin could find an aerodynamic fix for all of the new stall conditions.

In late 1997, the company discovered that directional problems could be caused by ice build-ups. Because the AE 2100 engines were more powerful and fuel-efficient than the Allison T56 engines that they replaced, the engines no longer produced enough bleed air to continuously warm the tail. This situation had been anticipated, but the cyclic system that replaced the old de-icing system was found to be insufficient when the C-130J flew in extreme conditions. This problem forced the company to extend the de-icing system higher and lower on the vertical stabilizer to prevent ice formation, causing another delay of five months. These issues resulted in Lockheed Martin exceeding its initial C-130J development budget of US$300 million. By May 1998, Lockheed had spent over US$900 million in development costs for the C-130J. By the end of 1998, the company owed the RAF about US$50 million in penalties due to the delivery delays.

FAA type certification occurred in September 1998 following 4,000 hours of flight testing. Deliveries commenced in 1999 as the Hercules C4 (C-130J-30) and Hercules C5 (C-130J).

On 23 December 2004, U.S. Deputy Secretary of Defense Paul Wolfowitz approved a program budget decision that ended the procurement of C-130J for the Air Force and completed the remaining KC-130J order for the Marine Corps in 2006, which would save US$5 billion in the Pentagon budget. Deficiencies with the C-130J that were cited to support the decision included being unable to drop heavy equipment, the inability to perform combat search-and-rescue missions, cold-weather performance issues, the risk of paratroopers hitting the fuselage when jumping out of the aircraft, major cost increases, and inadequate radar to fly into hurricanes. U.S. Secretary of Defense Donald Rumsfeld reversed this decision on May 10, 2005, after members of Congress stated that the canceling the pre-existing orders of 62 total Air Force aircraft over the following five years would result in about US$2 billion in termination costs to the government, which would have exceeded the cost of buying the aircraft.

In mid-June 2008, the United States Air Force awarded a $470 million contract to Lockheed Martin for six modified KC-130J aircraft for use by the Air Force and Special Operations Command. The contract led to C-130J variants that will replace aging HC-130s and MC-130s. The HC-130J Combat King II personnel recovery aircraft completed developmental testing on 14 March 2011. The final test point was air-to-air refueling, and was the first ever boom refueling of a C-130 where the aircraft's refueling receiver was installed during aircraft production. This test procedure also applied to the MC-130J Combat Shadow II aircraft in production for Air Force Special Operations Command.

Harvest HAWK

With the addition of the Marine Corps ISR / Weapon Mission Kit, the KC-130J tanker variant will be able to serve as an overwatch aircraft and can deliver ground support fire in the form of Hellfire or Griffin missiles, precision-guided bombs, and eventually 30mm Mk44 Bushmaster II cannon fire in a later upgrade. This capability, designated as "Harvest HAWK" (Hercules Airborne Weapons Kit), can be used in scenarios where precision is not a requisite, such as area denial.<ref name="Harvest Hawk">McCullough, Amy. "Refuel and Fire." Marine Corps Times, 1 June 2009.</ref> The aircraft retains its original capabilities in refueling and transportation. The kit can be removed within a day if necessary.

 TACAMO 

The United States Navy is considering replacing its fleet of E-6B Mercury aircraft with C-130J-30 Hercules aircraft in the Take Charge And Move Out (TACAMO) survivable nuclear communications role. The U.S. Navy's Naval Air Systems Command (NAVAIR) posted a solicitation for fatigue test aircraft to a government procurement website on 18 December 2020.  It is to award Lockheed Martin a contract for three "stretched" Hercules in fiscal years 2022 and 2023 for testing and analysis for the TACAMO mission.

Design
Externally similar to the classic Hercules in general appearance, the J-model features considerably updated technology. These differences include new Rolls-Royce AE 2100 D3 turboprop engines, Dowty R391 six-bladed composite scimitar propellers that have blade tips swept by 35 degrees, digital avionics (including head-up displays (HUDs) for each pilot), and reduced crew requirements. These changes have improved performance over its C-130E/H predecessors, such as 40% greater range, 21% higher maximum speed, and 41% shorter takeoff distance. Because of the deicing problem discovered late in the certification program, the C-130J includes a black rubber deicing boot at the bottom of the vertical fin, which is another visual difference from previous versions of the Hercules. The J-model is available in a standard-length or stretched -30 variant.

As a cargo and airlift aircraft, the C-130J's crew includes two pilots and one loadmaster (no navigator or flight engineer), while specialized USAF variants (e.g., AC-130J, EC-130J, MC-130J, HC-130J, WC-130J) may have larger crews, such as navigators/Combat Systems Officers or other specialized officer and enlisted air crew. The U.S. Marine Corps KC-130J uses a crew chief for expeditionary operations.

The aircraft can be configured with the "enhanced cargo handling system". The system consists of a computerized loadmaster's station from which the user can remotely control the under-floor winch and configure the flip-floor system to palletized roller or flat-floor cargo handling. Initially developed for the USAF, this system enables rapid role changes to be carried out and so extends the C-130J's time available to complete taskings.

Operational history

The Super Hercules has been used extensively by the USAF and USMC in Iraq and Afghanistan. Canada has also deployed its CC-130J aircraft to Afghanistan.

C-130Js from several countries have been deployed in support of the US Operation Odyssey Dawn and NATO's Operation Unified Protector during the 2011 Libyan civil war.

From the first flight on 5 April 1996 to 30 April 2013, 290 C-130J Super Hercules aircraft operated by 13 nations surpassed 1 million flight hours.Israel Receives First C-130J Super Hercules: ‘Shimshon’  – Lockheed press release, 26 June 2013

In January 2013, it was reported that some of Canada's CC-130J transports had counterfeit Chinese microchips in their cockpit displays that were made by an American Lockheed contractor L3 Communications.  These parts are more likely to fail and result in failures such as blank instrument screens during flight. A 14-month investigation by the U.S. Senate Armed Services Committee concluded that counterfeit parts in the Hercules and other American-made military equipment are prone to failure with potentially "catastrophic consequences." The U.S. congressional investigation reported the fake Hercules microchips were originally made by the Korean electronics giant Samsung in the 1990s, and more than a decade later, had been recycled, refurbished and remarked to appear genuine by a different supplier from China. Samsung later stated that "it is not possible to project the reliability" of the altered parts. The U.S. investigation reported that the problems on the Hercules first came to light in 2010 when the instrument panel failed on a U.S. Air Force aircraft during active duty.

Civilian use

The Modular Airborne FireFighting System (MAFFS) is a self-contained unit used for aerial firefighting that can be loaded onto a C-130 Hercules, which then allows the aircraft to be used as an air tanker against wildfires. This allows the U.S. Forest Service (USFS) to use military aircraft from the Air National Guard and Air Force Reserve to serve as an emergency backup resource to the civilian air tanker fleet."Modular Airborne FireFighting Systems (MAFFS)".  U.S. Forest Service, 24 June 2008. Retrieved 9 October 2010. The latest generation MAFFS II system was used for the first time on a fire in July 2010, using the C-130J Super Hercules. The 146th Airlift Wing was the first to transition to the MAFFS II system in 2008, and it remains the only unit flying the new system on the C-130J aircraft.

Orders and deliveries
The largest operator of the new model is the U.S. Air Force, which has ordered the aircraft in increasing numbers. Current operators of the C-130J are the USAF (including the Air Force Reserve Command and the Air National Guard), United States Marine Corps (being their fourth variant after KC-130F, KC-130R and KC-130T,) United States Coast Guard, Royal Air Force, Indian Air Force, Royal Canadian Air Force, Royal Australian Air Force, Royal Danish Air Force, Royal Norwegian Air Force, Israeli Air Force, and the Italian Air Force. As of March 2022, a total of 500 units have been produced.

International orders

The Royal Australian Air Force was the second international customer for the C-130J-30, with an initial order of twelve aircraft. An order for two more aircraft was planned, but was replaced by the purchase of a fifth Boeing C-17 Globemaster III. On 2 November 2022, the US State Department approved the possible sale of 24 C-130Js worth up to $6.35 billion to the Australian Air Force.

The Royal Norwegian Air Force ordered four C-130J-30s in 2007 to replace six aging C-130Hs in need of repairs.Trine, Jung Ling. "Contract for new transport planes signed."  Norwegian Defence Force website, 29 June 2007. Aircraft were delivered from November 2008Hoyle, Craig. "Norway takes delivery of first Lockheed Martin C-130J." Flight International, 17 November 2008. to 2010. One of these was lost in March 2012.

The Canadian Forces signed a US$1.4 billion contract with Lockheed Martin for seventeen new C-130J-30s in January 2008, as part of the procurement process to replace the existing C-130E and H models. The C-130J is officially designated as the CC-130J Hercules in Canadian service. The first C-130J was delivered to CFB Trenton in June 2010. The final C-130J was delivered in May 2012.

The Indian Air Force purchased six C-130J-30s in early 2008 at a cost of up to US$1.059 billion for its special operations forces in a package deal with the US government under its Foreign Military Sales (FMS) program. India has options to buy six more aircraft. The Indian government decided not to sign the Communications Interoperability and Security Memorandum of Agreement (CISMOA), which resulted in the exclusion of high precision GPS and other sensitive equipment. The IAF added similar equipment produced indigenously to the aircraft after delivery. In October 2011, India announced its intent to exercise the option for the six additional aircraft, following the C-130J's favorable performance in the 2011 Sikkim earthquake relief operations. In July 2012, the U.S. accepted India's request for the six more C-130Js through the FMS program. In December 2013, India's CCS approved the order for 6 more aircraft.

The Iraqi Air Force ordered six C-130J-30s in July 2008."Iraq Orders C-130Js."  Defense Industry Daily, 12 August 2009.

Qatar ordered four C-130Js in October 2008, along with spare parts and training for the Qatar Emiri Air Force. The contract is worth a total of US$393.6 million and deliveries are scheduled to begin in 2011.

The United Arab Emirates Air Force announced an order for twelve C-130J transports at the 2009 IDEX, with an announced value of US$1.3 billion. The United Arab Emirates requested 12 C-130Js through a Direct Commercial Sale in December 2009, with logistics support, training and related systems to be provided through a Foreign Military Sales program. A contract with Lockheed Martin has not been signed.

The Israeli Air Force is seeking to purchase nine C-130J-30s. In April 2010 Israel ordered one C-130J-30 with delivery in 2013, and was in contract talks for two more aircraft in June 2010. An option for a second C-130J-30 was exercised in April 2011, along with planning and advance long lead procurement of aircraft components to support the third C-130J Israeli aircraft. The first Israeli C-130J was delivered in June 2013 and was modified with Israeli-unique systems in the United States prior to its arrival in Israel in April 2014. Israel ordered a fourth C-130J-30 in July 2013. The C-130J's local name is "Shimshon".

The Kuwait Air Force signed a contract for three KC-130J air refueling tankers in May 2010, with deliveries to begin in late 2013. The KC-130Js will refuel its F-18s and augment its fleet of three militarized L-100s.

Oman increased its C-130J order in August 2010 by adding two C-130Js to the single C-130J-30 ordered in 2009. Deliveries are to be completed by early 2014.  The Royal Saudi Air Force has purchased two KC-130Js to be delivered in 2016.

The Mexican Government has requested 2 C-130J-30s.

The Mongolian Air Force is planning to buy 3 C-130Js."US notifies Congress of potential Libyan C-130J sale."  Flightglobal.com, 11 June 2013.

In July 2013, the C-130J became part of a competition in the Peruvian Air Force for a medium transport aircraft.  The Super Hercules was a candidate along with the EADS CASA C-295, the Alenia C-27J Spartan, the Antonov An-70, and the upgraded Antonov An-32. The Peruvian Air Force selected the C-27J in November 2013.

In 2015, the French Air Force ordered 4 Super Hercules to supplement existing capabilities due to the ongoing problems and delays of the ordered Airbus A400M, through FMS the French got 2 C-130J in 2017/2018 and 2 KC-130J in 2018/2019 (helicopter refuelling capability), especially supporting French overseas operations in Africa.

In January 2017, German defence minister announced the intention to purchase 3 C-130J and 3 KC-130J Hercules to acquire tactical airlift capabilities due to the delayed deliveries of the Airbus A400M. Together with the C-130J of the French Air Force this will form a joint air transport squadron.

In September 2018, Indonesia's state-owned news agency Antara reported that minister of defence Ryamizard Ryacudu said Indonesia is looking to acquire 5 C-130J Super Hercules aircraft. In September 2021, it was reported that Indonesia ordered five C-130J-30 aircraft from Lockheed Martin for the Indonesian Air Force in 2019, with the first aircraft already under construction. In 2023, Indonesian Air Force received its first C-130J-30 that arrived at Lanud Halim Perdanakusuma.

In June 2019, New Zealand's Minister of Defence Ron Mark identified the C-130J-30 as the preferred replacement for the Royal New Zealand Air Force's five remaining C-130Hs that are planned to be in service until 2023. In November 2019 the US Defense Security Cooperation Agency notified Congress of the potential sale of five C-130Js, 24 engines and related equipment for an estimated cost of US$1.4 billion. The sale was confirmed in June 2020, with the planes expected to be delivered between 2024 and 2025.

In September 2020, Philippine Air Force chief Allen T. Paredes planned to acquire 5 C-130J-30 aircraft. The quantity was later reduced to 2 after government funds were prioritized for the COVID-19 pandemic response. In December 2022, the Notice of Award has already been released for the acquisition of three C-130J-30 Super Hercules heavy transport aircraft from Lockheed Martin however no official announcement has been made by both parties including PAF.

In January 2022, the United States Department of State announced its approval of Egypt's request to purchase 12 C-130J aircraft with related equipment and notified Congress.

In November 2022, the US agreed to a Foreign Military Sales purchase by Australia of 24 C-130J-30 aircraft, that will effectively double the RAAF fleet after the existing aircraft have been retired.

Deliveries

Variants

C-130J Super Hercules
Tactical airlifter
C-130J-30
Lockheed Martin designation for its  extended fuselage variant; designated CC-130J by USAF for a short time after 2002 and later renamed into C-130J, so there are two different variants under the same designation.
C-130J-SOF
Variant outfitted with extended ISR equipment for use with special forces. Unveiled in June 2017.
CC-130J Hercules
Royal Canadian Air Force designation for the C-130J-30.
EC-130J Commando Solo III
Variant for the Air Force Special Operations Command, operated by the Pennsylvania Air National Guard.
HC-130J Combat King II
Long range patrol and air-sea rescue variant for the United States Coast Guard. USAF HC-130J version has changes for in-flight refueling.
KC-130J
Aerial refueling tanker and tactical airlifter version for United States Marine Corps.
MC-130J Commando II
Designed for Air Force Special Operations Command.  Originally named Combat Shadow II.
MC-130J Commando II Amphibious Capability
A proposed twin-float amphibious modification to allow support operations at sea and in near-shore areas; the initial flight test has been repeatedly pushed back.
WC-130J
Weather reconnaissance ("Hurricane Hunter") version for the Air Force Reserve Command.
Hercules C4
Royal Air Force designation for the C-130J-30
Hercules C5
Royal Air Force designation for the C-130J
LM-100J
A civilian version of the C-130J-30
SC-130J Sea Hercules
 Proposed maritime patrol version of the C-130J, designed for coastal surveillance and anti-submarine warfare. It is also being marketed to Canada to replace the Lockheed CP-140 Aurora MPA.

Operators

Algerian Air Force – 2 C-130J in service and 2 more on order as of June 2022.

Royal Australian Air Force – 12 C-130J-30s in service as of January 2014
37 Squadron

Royal Bahraini Air Force – One ex-RAF C-130J in service as of December 2018, with additional one on order.

Bangladesh Air Force – 5 ex-RAF C-130Js ordered. Four C-130J received.
 101 Squadron Special Flying Unit

Royal Canadian Air Force – 17 C-130J-30s in operation as of December 2018
436 Transport Squadron

Royal Danish Air Force – four C-130J-30s in service as of December 2018

Egyptian Air Force – two C-130Js on order for delivery in 2019.

French Air and Space Force – two C-130Js and two KC-130Js based at Orléans – Bricy Air Base in joint Franco-German unit. First C-130J inducted into service in January 2018.

German Air Force – 3 C-130J-30s and 3 KC-130Js on order, to be based at Évreux-Fauville Air Base in France in joint Franco-German unit.

Indian Air Force – Twelve C-130J-30s in service as of December 2019. A total of 12 C-130J-30s had been ordered by December 2013; one crashed in 2014 which was replaced in 2019.

Indonesian Air Force – One C-130J-30 received as of March 2023, of the five C-130J-30s on order.

Iraqi Air Force – three C-130J-30s in service as of January 2014, with a total of six C-130J-30s on order."Iraq Takes Delivery of Super Hercs" . Lockheed press release, 12 December 2012

Israeli Air Force – six C-130J-30s on order with deliveries planned to begin in spring 2013. It planned to acquire a total of nine C-130J-30s in 2008. 7 received as of January 2019.

Italian Air Force – 20 aircraft (four C-130Js, ten C-130J-30s, and six KC-130J) in service as of January 2022.

Kuwait Air Force – three KC-130Js delivered with an option to purchase three more. 

Libyan Air Force – 2 C-130J-30 on order

 Royal New Zealand Air Force – 5 C-130J-30 aircraft ordered in June 2020 to replace its existing fleet of C-130s.

Royal Norwegian Air Force – four C-130J-30s in service as of January 2014

Royal Air Force of Oman – one C-130J-30 in use as of January 2014. Two more C-130Js on order with delivery in 2014.

 Royal Saudi Air Force – two KC-130J tankers in service

Republic of Korea Air Force – four C-130J-30s ordered with for delivery in 2014. Two of four aircraft were delivered to Republic of Korea Air Force in 2014.

Swedish Air Force – four ex. Italian Air Force C-130J-30s on order for 2023 and 2024

Tunisian Air Force – two C-130J-30 received as of December 2014

Qatar Emiri Air Force – four C-130J-30s in use as of January 2014

Royal Air Force – 14 aircraft (1 C-130J, and 13 C-130J-30s) in service as of January 2020. On 22 March 2021, it was announced that the C-130J would be retired from the Royal Air Force by 2023.

United States Air Force – 273 C-130Js and variants in use as of March 2022
United States Marine Corps/United States Navy – 65 C-130Js and variants in use as of March 2022
United States Coast Guard – 15 C-130Js and variants in use as of March 2022

Accidents

C-130Js have been involved in the following notable accidents:
On 12 February 2007, Royal Air Force (RAF) Hercules C.4 (C-130J-30), ZH876, c/n 5460 (built 1998) was seriously damaged during landing on a desert airstrip by multiple improvised explosive devices (IEDs) along the airstrip, in Maysan province near Basrah, Iraq. There were no casualties to the crew and passengers, but the airframe was damaged beyond repair and subsequently destroyed at crash site by explosives to prevent it from falling into enemy hands.
On 15 March 2012, Royal Norwegian Air Force (RNoAF) C-130J-30, 10–5630 'SIW' (the newest of four C-130Js in the RNoAF inventory), c/n 5630, on a flight from Evenes Air Station, Norway to Kiruna, Sweden, impacted the side of Kebnekaise mountain at an altitude of  during bad weather after disappearing from radar, and disintegrated.  All five RNoAF crew aboard were killed. Continued bad weather meant that a RNoAF Lockheed P-3C Orion surveillance aircraft was not able to spot the wreckage until 17 March. The RNoAF C-130J aircraft was to collect soldiers, and fly back to the Norwegian base for the North Atlantic Treaty Organization (NATO/OTAN) exercise Cold Response.
On 28 March 2014, Indian Air Force (IAF) C-130J-30 KC-3803 (one of six operated by the IAF), operated by 77 Squadron 'Veiled Vipers', crashed near Gwalior, India, less than ten minutes after takeoff, killing all five personnel aboard. It was then during a climb to  when it stalled after running into wake turbulence from the lead aircraft in the formation, which caused it to crash; suggesting an error of judgement by the pilot.
On 2 October 2015, a United States Air Force (USAF) C-130J originally from the 317th Airlift Group at Dyess Air Force Base, assigned to the 774th Expeditionary Airlift Squadron, part of the 455th Air Expeditionary Wing, crashed approximately 28 seconds after takeoff from Jalalabad Airport, Afghanistan; killing all eleven onboard (six US airmen and five civilian contractors), and three Afghan troops in a guard tower on the ground. The pilot had previously jammed the control yoke with the case from night-vision goggles, but forgot to remove the case again during the next takeoff.

Specifications (C-130J)

See also

References

Notes

Citations

Bibliography

 Borman, Martin W. Lockheed C-130 Hercules. Marlborough, UK: Crowood Press, 1999. .
 Eden, Paul. "Lockheed C-130 Hercules". Encyclopedia of Modern Military Aircraft. London: Amber Books, 2004. .
 
 Hoyle, Craig. "World Air Forces Directory". Flight International, 4–10 December 2018, Volume 194, no. 5665. pp. 332–60. .
 Reed, Chris. Lockheed C-130 Hercules and Its Variants.'' Atglen, Pennsylvania: Schiffer Publishing, 1999. .

External links

 
 C-130J brochure on Lockheed Martin web site
 USAF C-130 Hercules fact sheet
 "The C-130J: New Hercules & Old Bottlenecks" on defenseindustrydaily.com
 C-130J Super Hercules Military transport aircraft on airrecognition.com
 IAF's C-130J Super Hercules Sets New World Record For Longest Non-Stop Flight which lasted 13-hour 31-minute

C-130J
1990s United States military transport aircraft
Four-engined tractor aircraft
High-wing aircraft
Four-engined turboprop aircraft
 J
Aircraft first flown in 1996